HMCS Sackville is a  that served in the Royal Canadian Navy and later served as a civilian research vessel. She is now a museum ship located in Halifax, Nova Scotia, and the last surviving Flower-class corvette.

Wartime service
Sackvilles keel was laid down as Patrol Vessel 2 at the Saint John Shipbuilding and Drydock Company of Saint John, New Brunswick in early 1940, the second of the s ordered by the Royal Canadian Navy.  She was launched on 15 May 1941 by Mrs. J. E. W. Oland, wife of the captain of the port, with the Mayor and entire town council of her namesake town in attendance. Sackville was commissioned into the Royal Canadian Navy on 30 December 1941 by Captain J. E. W. Oland, husband of the ship's sponsor. Her first commanding officer, Lieutenant W. R. Kirkland, RCNR was appointed on 30 December but did not join Sackville until 2 January. Kirkland was discharged in March 1942 as "unsuitable" after a poor working-up trip to Newfoundland in late February. The first lieutenant reported that Kirkland had been unable to discharge his duties and had been abusive to his officers.  After rescuing the survivors from the sunken Greek ship Lily, Sackville was unable to re-locate her convoy, ONS 68.  The first lieutenant then took the step of relieving Kirkland and assuming command.  The original crew was reposted to other RCN ships and the already trained crew of  under Lieutenant-Commander Alan H. Easton, RCNR was drafted onto the ship on 6 April 1942.  Also in April Sackville received Canadian-built SW1C radar and worked up at Halifax and St. Margarets Bay.

The ship was finally assigned to Escort Group C-3 of the Mid-Ocean Escort Force along with two others ( and ) on 15 May 1942 to replace corvettes going for refit. In August 1942 Sackville fought a series of fierce actions escorting Convoy ON-115. Deprived of air cover by heavy fog, the convoy was attacked by two successive U-boat "wolfpacks" off the coast of Newfoundland. On August 3, Sackville caught the German submarine  on the surface and, as the submarine dived, made a series of depth charge attacks which badly damaged the submarine. U-43 survived but had to retreat to France for repairs with serious damage to its engines, compressors, a leaking hatch and a crewman with internal injuries. The next day Sackville attacked  as it dived, causing the submarine to break off its attack leaving Sackville to rescue two survivors from an abandoned but still floating merchant ship. Only a few hours later, Sackville detected  on the surface with radar and landed a four-inch shell on the submarine's conning tower followed by a depth charge. U-552 nearly sank but managed to regain control and creep back to Germany heavily damaged. Sackvilles attacks had played a key role in allowing the 41 ship convoy to escape with the loss of only two ships.

Sackville continued in her escort role until starting an extensive refit at Thompson Bros. Machinery Co. Ltd. in Liverpool, Nova Scotia in January 1943. She returned to service in April and was assigned to Escort Group C-1 where she remained until reassigned to a new group Escort Group 9 in July. The group was disbanded following the loss of three of its ships on 20–22 September and the ship assigned to group C-2, where the ship remained on Atlantic escort work until going for refit in Galveston, Texas in February 1944.

Returning to Halifax in May 1944 the vessel worked up in Bermuda and was then assigned to Escort Group C-2  which left for Derry escorting convoy HX-297 on 29 June 1944.

At Derry the boilers were cleaned, which revealed a serious leak in one of them. Repairs were unsuccessful and the ship was no longer considered suitable for convoy escort work.

However, almost immediately afterwards the decision was made to convert her to a loop layer, laying anti-submarine indicator loops across harbour entrances, her damaged boiler removed to provide storage for the cable and the 4-inch gun replaced with a pair of cranes. She remained in this role until paid off in April 1946 and laid up in reserve.

Trans-Atlantic convoys escorted

Civilian service
Most Flower-class corvettes were scrapped shortly after the war, however Sackville was laid up in reserve. She was reactivated in 1952 and converted to a research vessel for the Department of Marine and Fisheries. The armament was removed, the hull repainted black in place of the original dazzle camouflage and the new pennant number 532 painted on the hull (changed to 113 in the late 1950s). A laboratory was built on the aft superstructure in 1964 and the bridge enclosed in 1968. She remained in service until December 1982, with her last cruise in July 1982.

Museum ship

The original intention had been to acquire , which had been sold to the Dominican Republic and renamed Juan Alejandro Acosta but this vessel was wrecked (along with another Flower-class corvette - Cristobal Colon, the former ) by Hurricane David in 1979. This left Sackville as the sole remaining Flower-class corvette.

The ship was transferred to the Canadian Naval Corvette Trust (now the Canadian Naval Memorial Trust) on 28 October 1983 and restored to her 1944 appearance (apart from minor details in her camouflage and the presence of the "barber pole" red and white pattern around her funnel which had been removed before 1944). It had originally been planned to restore the ship to her 1942 appearance but this proved too expensive.

She currently serves the summer months as a museum ship moored beside the Maritime Museum of the Atlantic in Halifax, Nova Scotia, while spending her winters securely in the naval dockyard at CFB Halifax under the care of Maritime Forces Atlantic, the Atlantic fleet of Royal Canadian Navy. Sackvilles presence in Halifax is considered appropriate, as the port was an important North American convoy assembly port during the war.

In September 2003, Sackville broke loose during Hurricane Juan and struck the schooner Larinda, a yacht inspired by the 1767 Boston schooner , moored beside her. The schooner's owners sued the Naval Memorial Trust in 2009 but the Nova Scotia Supreme Court ruled in Sackvilles favour on 4 August 2011, concluding that the Trust had taken all necessary and appropriate precautions to secure Sackville.

Sackville makes her first appearance each spring when she is towed by a naval tugboat from HMC Dockyard to a location off Point Pleasant Park on the first Sunday in May to participate in the Commemoration of the Battle of the Atlantic ceremonies held at a memorial in the park overlooking the entrance to Halifax Harbour. Sackville typically hosts several dozen Royal Canadian Navy veterans on this day and has also participated in several burials at sea for dispersing the ashes of Royal Canadian Navy veterans of the Battle of the Atlantic at this location. In 2018, the ship underwent CAN$3.5 million in repairs at CFB Halifax.

Recognition
In 1988, Sackville was designated a National Historic Site of Canada, due to her status as the last Flower-class corvette known to exist.

On 4 November 1998, Canada Post issued a 45¢ stamp featuring HMCS Sackville as part of the Naval Vessels series. The stamps were designed by Dennis George Page, based on an illustration by Todd Hawkins and on photographs by Canadian Naval Memorial Trust.

HMCS Sackville memorial centre
 plans were being looked at for a $50 million memorial centre which could include a permanent land based berth for the ship, as well as a Canadian Naval memorial and museum.

HMCS Sackville underwent a major refit from February through October 2018.

Greyhound

HMCS Sackville was used as the model for the corvette, HMCS Dodge, call sign Dicky, in the 2020 film, Greyhound. The producers of the movie took numerous 3D scans of the ship's exterior to create the CGI version for the movie.

Gallery

See also
List of ships of the Canadian Navy
List of museum ships
Ship replica
Ships preserved in museums

References

Bibliography

External links

 HMCS Sackville official site.
 HMCS Sackville (K 181) at uboat.net.
 HMCS Sackville photo gallery.
 Haze Gray and Underway
 ReadyAyeReady.com
 The 1993 film "Lifeline to Victory" was filmed aboard HMCS Sackville.
 Of the 236 corvettes that were laid down in Canada and Britain, 111 sailed from Canadian slips
 HNSA Ship Page: HMCS Sackville
 HMCS Sackville on the Arnold Hague database at convoyweb.org.uk.

Ships of the Royal Canadian Navy
Flower-class corvettes of the Royal Canadian Navy
Ships built in New Brunswick
Museum ships in Canada
Museum ships in Nova Scotia
History of Halifax, Nova Scotia
National Historic Sites in Nova Scotia
1941 ships
Maritime museums in Nova Scotia
Museums in Halifax, Nova Scotia
Naval museums in Canada